Pingtan may refer to:

 Suzhou pingtan, a variety of traditional Chinese storytelling

Places in China
 Pingtan County, Fuzhou, Fujian
 Pingtan Island, main island of Pingtan County, Fuzhou
 Pingtan Township,  Tongdao Dong Autonomous County, Hunan

Towns
 Pingtan, Chongqing
 Pingtan, Guangdong, in Huizhou, Guangdong
 Pingtan, Shanxi, in Yangquan, Shanxi
 Pingtan, Dazhou, Sichuan
 Pingtan, Neijiang, Sichuan
 Pingtan, Yuechi County, Sichuan